Freedom Run is the third studio album by The Rifles released 19 September 2011, produced by Charles Rees and Chris Potter. On 2 August 2011 The Rifles announced that the first single from the album would be "Tangled Up in Love".

Track listing

Notes

2011 albums
The Rifles (band) albums